Zhang Xielin (born 1940) is a Chinese table-tennis player who carried the Olympic flag in 2008 Summer Olympics Opening Ceremony.

Table tennis career
He was active in the 1960s and uses a rare pen-grip chopping style. Utilizing steady chops and unpredictable spins, He is one of the earliest successful long-pimple rubber players, and the first Chinese player to win a men's doubles champion (with Wang Zhiliang, at the 1963 World Table Tennis Championships).

His eight World Championship medals included four gold medals; in addition to the men's doubles he won a mixed doubles with Lin Huiqing and two in the team event.

See also
 List of table tennis players
 List of World Table Tennis Championships medalists

References

Table tennis players from Shanghai
1940 births
Living people
Chinese male table tennis players
World Table Tennis Championships medalists